Dmitry Maksimov (born 1 April 1978) is a Russian judoka.

Achievements

External links 
 
 

1978 births
Living people
Russian male judoka
Judoka at the 2004 Summer Olympics
Olympic judoka of Russia
Place of birth missing (living people)